Sten Karl Leopold "Sten-Pelle" Pettersson (11 September 1902 – 1 June 1984) was a Swedish track and field athlete who competed in sprint and hurdling events. He competed at the 1924, 1928 and 1932 Summer Olympics in the 110 and 400 m hurdles and 400 m and 4 × 400 m sprint relay (six events in total). He won a bronze medal in the 110 m hurdles in 1924, and finished fourth in the 400 m hurdles and 4 × 400 m relay in 1928, while failing to reach the finals on other occasions.

Pettersson held two world records, for about a year each, in the 110 m (1927–1928) and 400 m hurdles (1925–1927). In 1925 he became the first recipient of the Svenska Dagbladet Gold Medal.

References

External links

dataOlympics profile

1902 births
1984 deaths
Athletes from Stockholm
Swedish male hurdlers
Olympic athletes of Sweden
Olympic bronze medalists for Sweden
Athletes (track and field) at the 1924 Summer Olympics
Athletes (track and field) at the 1928 Summer Olympics
Athletes (track and field) at the 1932 Summer Olympics
World record setters in athletics (track and field)
Medalists at the 1924 Summer Olympics
Olympic bronze medalists in athletics (track and field)